Word of Mouth (previously WOMO - Word Of Mouth Online) is an Australian-based business review site containing crowd-sourced reviews of local businesses. The site is entirely based on user-generated content and, in 2013, it was ranked as top Australian business review website with 400,000 reviews for businesses based in Australia. As of December 2019, the site lists over 624,000 reviews.

History
Word of Mouth was founded in 2007 as WOMOW Pty Ltd by Fiona Adler and Brad Bond. They conceived the initial idea for Word of Mouth from Adler's difficulty in locating good local tradespeople in the Melbourne area. Initially the site was focused on businesses in Melbourne, later, in 2008, it expanded to the whole of Australia. The website is solely built on user-generated confined content, and a business listing is added when members first review a business on the website.

In 2011, the 'W' was dropped from the acronym and launched as womo.com.au.

The company was bought by Oneflare Pty Ltd in early 2015 and have since relocated to Sydney working in the offices with Oneflare. As of 2014, Word of Mouth has 400,000 reviews for 160,000 local businesses operating in Australia.

In 2016, it underwent a brand refresh and was re-launched as Word of Mouth.

Features
Word of Mouth's website, wordofmouth.com.au, is a crowd-sourced local business review and social networking site. The site has pages devoted to individual locations, such as hotels or professional services, where website users can submit a review on their products or services. Word of Mouth developed a TrustFactor methodology which incorporates how much the website knows about the individual reviewers and how much history and contributions they have with the site. Each review on the site is weighted by the member's TrustFactor. Reviews from members with a high TrustFactor count for more than reviews from those with a low TrustFactor. Some reviews from new members are not live until they gain a reputation by reviewing other businesses.

It also runs a point based rewards program based on member's reviews, referrals and other actions. The gained points are exhibited on a leadership board and are later claimed for shopping vouchers.

Revenue
Word of Mouth's revenues come from businesses upgrading their listing to join a premium program called the Happy Customers Program. This provides tools for businesses to encourage customer reviews and showcase their reviews through physical and digital means. It also allows businesses to display additional information on their page and be given priority placement with sponsored tags in the search results.

References

External links
 Official website

Companies based in Melbourne
Internet properties established in 2007